Triglochin trichophora  is an annual herb native to Australia.

Description
It grows as an annual herb from 5 to 15 centimetres in height.

Taxonomy
This species was published in 1846 by Christian Gottfried Daniel Nees von Esenbeck. It has had an uneventful taxonomic history.

Distribution and habitat
It grows in swamps and coastal areas of Western Australia, South Australia and Victoria.

References

Juncaginaceae
Monocots of Australia
Angiosperms of Western Australia
Flora of South Australia
Flora of Victoria (Australia)
Taxa named by Christian Gottfried Daniel Nees von Esenbeck
Plants described in 1846